Camarata may refer to:

 Salvador Camarata (1913–2005), American jazz trumpeter
 Camarata Music Company
 Camarata, a town in ancient Mauretania